Bice Sechi-Zorn (1928 – 10 December 1984, Hamburg) was an Italian/American nuclear physicist, and professor at the University of Maryland.

Life
She graduated from University of Cagliari.  She met her husband, Gus T. Zorn, at the University of Padua. They both worked at the University of Maryland.
She was a professor of physics beginning from 1976 to 1984.

A Gus T. Zorn and Bice Sechi-Zorn Professorship in Experimental Physics is named for her.

References

External links
Academic search

American nuclear physicists
1928 births
1984 deaths
American women physicists
Italian women scientists
University of Maryland, College Park faculty
University of Cagliari alumni
20th-century Italian physicists
20th-century American women scientists
Women nuclear physicists